Yarkhun is an administrative unit, known as Union Council, of Chitral District in the Khyber Pakhtunkhwa province of Pakistan. The valley consists of 39 villages and hamlets ranging from Breb to Broghill towards the north. The village of Bang is the headquarters of the Yarkhun Union Council. The valley was ruled by the Rizakhel tribe of Chitral from 1790 to 1954-69. Hakeem Mama (1790),the descendant of Mohd Raza, was the first hakim of the area, while Langar Murad Khan was the last hakim (1954).

Timeline of Hakims of Yarkhun
S.No Name of Hakim Duration Governors of Mastuj Mehtars of Chitral/Yasin/APAs 
1 Shah Qasim 1775-1790c Qura Shah Khairullah 
2 Mama 1790-1830c Mulk Aman Mulk Aman/Sulaiman Shah 
3 Qalandar Khan 1830-1855c Mulk Aman 2 Gohar Aman 
4 Abdullah Khan 1855-1892 Mir Aman/Pahlawan 
Bahadur 
Gohar Aman/Aman ul Mulk and 
Afzal ul Mulk 
5 Chust 1892 Shah Nadir Khan Sher Afzal Khan 
6 Abdullah Khan 1892-1895 Raja Bahadur Khan Sardar Nizam ul Mulk 
7 Sultan Quli Khan 1895-1900 Raja Bahadur Khan APA Chitral 
8 Muhammad Karim 
Khan 
1900-1901 Raja Bahadur Khan APA Chitral 
9 Muhammad Kuda Khan 1901-1905 Upper Yarkhun Raja Bahadur Khan APA Chitral 
10 Ibadullah Khan 1900-1908 Lower Yarkhun Raja Bahadur Khan APA 
11 Abdul Murad Khan 1908-1923 Raja Bahadur 
Khan/Ataleq Bahadur 
Shah/ M.J Ghulam 
Dastagir/ Nasir ul Mulk 
APA/Shuja ul Mulk 
12 Ibadullah Khan 1923-1925 Nasir ul Mulk Shuja ul Mulk 
13 Abdul Murad Khan 1925-1936c Nasir ul Mulk/ 
Khoshwakht ul Mulk 
Shuja ul Mulk/Nasir ul Mulk 
14 Langhar Murad Khan 1938c-1954 Khoshwakht ul Mulk Nasir ul Mulk/Muzafar ul Mulk/ Saif 
ur Rehman/Saif ul Mulk Nasir 
(Sources for making this chart are Gurdon 1895: Murtaza 1962 : Judicial Council Records) hidayad ur rehman, 2020

'''''' is the largest district in the Khyber-Pakhtunkhwa province of Pakistan, covering an area of 14,850 km². It is the northernmost district of Pakistan. The district of Chitral is divided into two tehsils and 24 Union Councils.
Chitral
Mastuj

See also 

 Chitral District

References

External links
Khyber-Pakhtunkhwa Government website section on Lower Dir
United Nations

Chitral District
Tehsils of Chitral District
Union councils of Khyber Pakhtunkhwa
Populated places in Chitral District
Union councils of Chitral District